Ute Steppin  (born ) was a German female volleyball player. 

She was part of the East Germany women's national volleyball team at the 1988 Summer Olympics, and of the Germany women's national volleyball team at the 1996 Summer Olympics. She participated in the 1994 FIVB Volleyball Women's World Championship. On club level she played with Schweriner SC.

Clubs
 Schweriner SC (1994)

References

External links
Sports Reference
www.munzinger.de
volleyball.de
Getty Images

1965 births
Living people
People from Crivitz
People from Bezirk Schwerin
German women's volleyball players
East German sportswomen
Sportspeople from Mecklenburg-Western Pomerania
Olympic volleyball players of Germany
Olympic volleyball players of East Germany
Volleyball players at the 1988 Summer Olympics
Volleyball players at the 1996 Summer Olympics